Smalls Lighthouse stands on the largest of a group of wave-washed basalt and dolerite rocks known as The Smalls approximately  west of Marloes Peninsula in Pembrokeshire, Wales, and  west of Grassholm. It was erected in 1861 by engineer James Douglass to replace a previous lighthouse which had been erected in 1776 on the same rock. It is the most remote lighthouse operated by Trinity House.

Previous lighthouse

History 
The original Smalls Lighthouse was erected at the instigation of John Phillips (a Liverpool merchant and shipowner) between 1775 and 1776, to the plans of Liverpool musical-instrument maker Henry Whiteside. It stood on nine oak pillars, allowing the sea to pass through beneath. The original intention had been to use cast iron, but this was "soon abandoned for English oak, as being more elastic and trustworthy".  Although it suffered from some rocking, it stood for 80 years.

The light was provided by eight oil lamps placed in glass-faceted reflectors. These were replaced in 1817 by double the number of lamps, together with silvered parabolic reflectors, which were far more efficient.

During its life a significant number of extra struts were added beyond the original nine. The pillar-based design has since been used successfully in many maritime structures.

When Whiteside visited the lighthouse in 1777, he was stranded for a month by gales which showed no sign of abating so that supplies were almost exhausted. He wrote a message to a friend in St. David's placed in a bottle inside a casket with a note to the finder "We doubt not but that whoever takes this up will be so merciful as to cause it to be sent to Thomas Williams, Esq, Trelithin, near St. David's, Wales". Two days later it arrived almost outside the door of the addressee to whom it was duly delivered.

Smalls Lighthouse Tragedy
The old lighthouse brought about a change in lighthouse policy in 1801 after a gruesome episode, sometimes called the Smalls Lighthouse Tragedy. Thomas Howell and Thomas Griffith, the two-person team that managed the lighthouse, were publicly known to quarrel. When Griffith died in a freak accident, Howell feared that if he discarded the body into the sea, authorities might accuse him of murder. As Griffith's body began to decompose, Howell built a makeshift coffin for the corpse and lashed it to an outside shelf. Stiff winds blew the box apart, and the body's arm fell within view of the hut's window. As the winds would blow, gusts would catch the arm and move it in a way that made the appendage appear to beckon. In spite of his former partner's decaying corpse and working the lighthouse alone, Howell was able to keep the house's lamp lit. When Howell was finally relieved of duty, the impact of the situation was so emotionally taxing that his friends did not recognize him. As a result, the governing body changed the lighthouse policy to make lighthouse teams rosters of three people, which continued until the automation of British lighthouses in the 1980s.

In media 
In 2011 the Smalls Lighthouse Tragedy was the subject of a BBC radio play called The Lighthouse, written by Alan Harris.  The 2016 British film The Lighthouse, directed by Chris Crow, is also loosely based on the incident. The 2019 film The Lighthouse by the American director Robert Eggers was also partly inspired by the tragedy.

1831 disaster
In 1831 the tower was assaulted by a wave of such proportions that the floor of the keepers' room was torn up and slammed against the ceiling, injuring all the keepers, one so severely that he died. However the damage was repaired and the lighthouse survived another thirty years before it was replaced.

Current lighthouse

The new lighthouse was designed by James Walker, Engineer-in-chief at Trinity House, with Douglass serving as chief engineer. The first stone of the new tower was laid on 26 June 1857,  Trinity House having bought out the previous leaseholders in 1836. The tower was completed in 1861.

In 1978 a helideck was erected above the lantern and in 1987 the lighthouse was automated. It was the first lighthouse in the country to have a flushing toilet installed.

The lighthouse's story was presented in the 2006 BBC Television programme Coast, Series 1, episode "Bristol to Cardigan Bay".

Captain T. H. Sumner
Smalls Lighthouse is important in the history of navigation. In 1837 the American Captain Thomas Hubbard Sumner discovered the concept of celestial position lines, the circle of equal altitude, as he was approaching Smalls Lighthouse in thick weather; they form the basis of nearly all modern celestial navigation and were sometimes called Sumner Lines.

See also
 List of lighthouses in Wales

References

External links

 Trinity House
  Includes an analysis of the origins of the name 'The Smalls'

Lighthouses completed in 1861
Lighthouses in Pembrokeshire
Islands of Pembrokeshire
Uninhabited islands of Wales
1861 establishments in Wales
Grade II listed lighthouses
Grade II listed buildings in Pembrokeshire